Pahlavan (also Romanized as Pahlavān) is a village in Karaftu Rural District, in the Central District of Takab County, West Azerbaijan Province, Iran. At the 2006 census, its population was 10, in 10 families.

References 

Populated places in Takab County